The Army of Africa or Moroccan Army Corps (') was a field army of the Spanish Army that garrisoned the Spanish protectorate in Morocco from the late 19th century until Morocco's independence in 1956.

At the start of the 20th century, the Spanish Empire's colonial possessions in Africa comprised Morocco, Spanish Sahara, Ifni, Cape Juby and Spanish Guinea.

Spanish Morocco

Spanish Morocco was the closest Spanish colonial territory to mainland Spain and the most difficult to control. A major Moroccan revolt against both Spanish and French colonial rule began in 1921, with the destruction of a Spanish army at Annual. The Rif tribes were finally subdued only with difficulty by substantial Franco-Spanish forces after several years of fighting.

Background and origins
Spain maintained garrisons in its two Moroccan coastal enclaves of Melilla from the fifteenth century onwards and Ceuta (which despite  being Portuguese since 1415, chose to be the only Portuguese territory to side with the Spanish Empire after Portugal won back its independence in 1640 - due to the Iberian Union of 1580-1640). At different times these were made up of sailors, disciplinary companies, marine infantry, free companies and detachments from metropolitan units. The Spanish Army of Africa can be said to have originated as a permanent institution with the establishment in 1893 of the Regimiento de África N° 1 (1st African Infantry Regiment).

Recruitment of Moroccan troops
Following the Melilla Campaign of 1909–10 Spain began expanding inland from its established coastal holdings and a force of Policia Indigena (Native Police) was created with Moroccan personnel. This indigenous force provided the basis for the establishment in 1911 of the Regulares - Moroccan infantry and cavalry units with Spanish officers.

The Tiradores de Ifni
The Spanish Army of Africa included an indigenous light infantry force under European officers, designated as the Tiradores de Ifni. In existence from 1934 to 1969, this corps was modelled on the North African tirailleurs of the French Army.

Spanish Legion
The Spanish Legion was formed by royal decree of King Alfonso XIII on 28 January 1920 as the Regiment of Foreigners. El Tercio was modeled on the French Foreign Legion. Its purpose was to provide a corps of professional troops to fight in Spain's colonial campaigns in North Africa in place of conscript units that were proving ineffective. The initial make-up of the regiment was that of a headquarters unit and three battalions known as Banderas ("banners") - an archaic 16th-century term.

1920–1936
By the Rif War of the 1920s, the Army of Africa was composed in essence of the Spanish Legion and the Regulares; plus cazadores (Spanish infantry), artillery, engineers and support units. In total it numbered 30,000 soldiers and was the most professional and effective fighting force in the 100,000-man Spanish Army during the 1920s and 30s. Indigenous infantry recruited in the enclave of Ifni (Tiradores de Ifni) from 1934 on, were also considered part of the Army of Africa. A locally recruited gendarmerie, the Mehalas de la Mehalla' Jalifiana, numbering about 5,000 men and modeled on the Moroccan Goumiers attached to the French Army of Africa, was established in 1923 and provided support to the regular units of the Army of Africa. 

Following the conclusion of the Rif War, the garrison of Spanish Morocco was reduced to the units listed above; plus seven infantry battalions, six cavalry squadrons and six artillery batteries from mainland Spain assigned to African service on a rotation basis.

Role in the Spanish Civil War
The Army of Africa was to play a key part during the Spanish Civil War of 1936–1939. Along with other units in the Spanish Army, the Army of Africa rose against the Second Spanish Republic and took part in the Spanish coup of July 1936 on the side of the Nacionales. On 18 July 1936, General Francisco Franco assumed the supreme command over this force.

Spanish Morocco fell to the rebels without significant opposition. The initial intention was to transport the Army of Africa to mainland Spain by sea. However the crews of the majority of ships in the Spanish Navy had remained loyal to the Republican government in Madrid, overwhelming the officers who had joined the rising. Between 29 July and 5 August 1936 1,500 members of the Army of Africa were accordingly transported to mainland Spain in a bold airlift led by Junkers Ju 52 transport planes supplied by Nazi Germany. The fascist régime of the Kingdom of Italy provided Savoia-Marchetti SM.81 bombers to provide air cover for merchant ships carrying 3,000 soldiers and equipment from Morocco on 5 August. Thereafter daily flights continued until about 8,000 Moroccans and legionaries, with supporting artillery, were gathered at Seville.

After landing in Spain, the Army of Africa was split into two columns, one commanded by General Juan Yagüe and the other commanded by Colonel José Enrique Varela. Yagüe's force advanced north, making remarkably rapid gains, and then turned north-eastwards towards Madrid and Toledo. Varela's force entered Andalusia and took control of the key cities of Seville, Granada, and Córdoba. Thanks mostly to the Army of Africa's advances, almost all of western Spain was in Francoist Nationalist hands by the end of September 1936. By early 1937 the Army of Africa's strength had been increased to 60,000 men. The Legion and Regulares spearheaded the Nacionales operations for the remainder of the war and played a central role in the Nationalist victory.

1940–1956
With the ending of the Civil War the Army of Africa was reduced to a peacetime establishment. However under Franco it was accorded a higher profile in Spain itself than had been the case under either monarchy or republic. During the 1940s detachments from the Tiradores de Ifni garrisoned the Canary Islands, while a mounted Guardia Mora ("Moorish Guard") undertook ceremonial duties in Madrid.

Post Moroccan independence
Following Moroccan independence in 1956 the bulk of the locally recruited Regulares were transferred to the new Royal Moroccan Army. The cities of Melilla and Ceuta, and the lesser plazas de soberanía as well, remained Spanish and are still garrisoned by Legion and Regulares units.

Ifni remained under Spanish administration until June 1969. However widespread disturbances in the territory in 1956 and the Ifni War of 1957-58 led to substantial desertions amongst the indigenous rank and file of the Tiradores de Ifni. Accordingly, the four tabors which made up this force underwent a process of "europeanisation" in which the majority of their personnel were recruited from Spain itself.

See also
Spanish Legion
Regulares
Tiradores de Ifni
Colonial Guard of Spanish Guinea
Civil Guard (Spain)
Mohamed Meziane

References

External sources
 Beevor, Antony.  The Spanish Civil War.  New York: Penguin Books, 2001.

Military history of Spain
Spanish Army
Rif War
Africa, Army of
Spanish Africa